Nelson Asuquo Effiong  (born 1953 in Oron, Akwa Ibom) is a Nigerian politician and senator representing Akwa Ibom South in the Nigerian Senate. He was also an Akwa Ibom State House of Assembly member 1992–2007.

In 2015 he was elected into office of the Senate under the People's Democratic Party (Nigeria) and thereafter decamped to APC in 2017.

References 

1953 births
Living people
Akwa Ibom State politicians
Members of the Senate (Nigeria)
All Progressives Congress politicians
University of Houston alumni
Methodist Boys' High School alumni
Oron people